The Electoral Reform Select Committee is one of many select committees of the Malaysian House of Representatives, which study the matters related to the election process in Malaysia. It was first announced by Speaker of the House of Representatives Mohamad Ariff Md Yusof in April 2019 that a new select committee for electoral reform was to be set up. However, it is noted that an electoral reform select committee previously existed between October 2011 and April 2012. Unlike the yet-to-be-confirmed select committee, the temporary committee was not designed to study bills.

The creation of the new Elections Select Committee was among four new select committees announced by the Minister in the Prime Minister's Department in charge of legal affairs, Liew Vui Keong, on 17 October 2019.

Report 
The report from the special select committee for electoral reform (2011-2012) is available on its website: .

Membership

14th Parliament 
As of December 2019, the members of the committee are as follows:

12th Parliament 
This temporary select committee had a six-month time frame to complete its report on improving the electoral system from the date of its establishment. The responsibility, role and duty of the committee were to strengthen the Election Commission of Malaysia (EC) and on fair and free election process by studying associated useful matters. The special select committee had to complete and table a report as well as submitting related recommendations to the House for approval or according to any orders from the House.

Chair of the Consideration of Bills Select Committee

See also
Parliamentary Committees of Malaysia

References

External links
SPECIAL SELECT COMMITTEE ON ELECTORAL REFORM

Parliament of Malaysia
Committees of the Parliament of Malaysia
Committees of the Dewan Rakyat